The Albacore-class gunboat, also known as "Crimean gunboat", was a class of 98 gunboats built for the Royal Navy in 1855 and 1856 for use in the 1853-1856 Crimean War. The design of the class, by W. H. Walker, was approved on 18 April 1855. The first vessels were ordered the same day, and 48 were on order by July; a second batch, which included Surly, were ordered in early October.

Design
The Albacore class was almost identical to the preceding , also designed by W.H. Walker. The ships were wooden-hulled, with both steam power and sails, and of shallow draught for coastal bombardment in the shallow waters of the Baltic and Black Seas during the Crimean War.

Their displacement was 284 tons and they measured 232 tons Builder's Old Measurement. The Albacore-class  carried a crew of 36-40 men.

One of the vessels of the class, HMS Surly, cost £9,867, of which the hull accounted for £5,656 and machinery £3,298.

Propulsion
Half of the ships had two-cylinder horizontal single-expansion trunk steam engines, built by John Penn and Sons, with two boilers. The other half had two-cylinder horizontal single-expansion direct-acting steam engines, built by Maudslay, Sons and Field, with three boilers.

Armament
Ships of the class were armed with one 68-pounder (95 cwt) muzzle-loading smoothbore gun, one 32-pounder muzzle-loading smoothbore gun (originally two 68-pounders were planned but the forward gun was substituted by a 32-pounder) and two 24-pounder howitzers.

Ships

References

Bibliography

Gunboat classes
 Albacore